Esther Rabasa Grau is the ambassador of Andorra to the BeNeLux countries Belgium, the Netherlands and Luxembourg. She is also Permanent Representative to the European Union, Council of Europe (until 2019)  as well as to the Organisation for the Prohibition of Chemical Weapons.

References

Living people
Andorran women ambassadors
Ambassadors of Andorra to Belgium
Ambassadors of Andorra to Luxembourg
Ambassadors of Andorra to the Netherlands
Permanent Representatives of Andorra to the European Union
Permanent Representatives of Andorra to the Organisation for the Prohibition of Chemical Weapons
Permanent Representatives of Andorra to the Council of Europe
Year of birth missing (living people)